Hartford is the capital of the U.S. state of Connecticut.

Hartford may also refer to:

Places
England
 Hartford, Cambridgeshire, a village near Huntingdon
 Hartford, Cheshire
 Hartford, Somerset
 Hartford End, Essex

United States
 Hartford, Alabama
 Hartford, Arkansas
 Hartford, Connecticut
 Hartford, Georgia
 Hartford, Illinois
 Hartford City, Indiana
 Hartford, Iowa
 Hartford, Kansas
 Hartford, Kentucky
 Hartford, Maine
 Hartford, Michigan
 Hartford, Missouri
 Hartford, New Jersey
 Hartford, New York
 Hartford, Ohio, in Licking County
 Hartford, Trumbull County, Ohio
 Hartford, Providence, Rhode Island, a neighborhood
 Hartford, South Dakota
 Hartford, Tennessee
 Hartford, Vermont, a town
 Hartford (village), Vermont, in the town
 Hartford, West Virginia
 Hartford, Wisconsin, a city
 Hartford (town), Wisconsin, neighboring the city

Other uses 
 Hartford (surname)
 The Hartford Financial Services Group, Inc., a company based in Hartford, Connecticut
 USS Hartford (1858), Admiral David Farragut's flagship in the American Civil War
 University of Hartford, a private university located in West Hartford, Connecticut
 Hartford Blues, American football team that played in the NFL in 1926
 Hartford Hawks, the athletic program of the University of Hartford
 Pope-Hartford, American manufacturer of automobiles between 1904-1914.

See also 
 Harford (disambiguation)
 Hartford City (disambiguation)
 Hertford (disambiguation)
 New Hartford (disambiguation)